Legislative elections were held in French Polynesia on 10 September 1972 for the Territorial Assembly. Anti-autonomist parties won a majority.

Results

Elected members

Aftermath
Louis Palmer died in February 1973 and was replaced by Lucien Ratinassamy. Pouvanaa a Oopa resigned during the term of the Territorial Assembly and was replaced by Yannick Amaru. André Teikitutoua died shortly before the 1977 elections and was not replaced.

References

French
1972 in French Polynesia
Elections in French Polynesia
September 1972 events in Oceania
Election and referendum articles with incomplete results